This is a list of Fireball sailboat championships.

World Championships

IYRU Youth Sailing World Championships

The fireball was used at the 6th Youth Sailing World Championships held in Toronto, Canada.

Continental Championships

Reference

References

Fireball (dinghy)